Spain participated in and won the Eurovision Song Contest 1968 with the song "La, la, la" by Massiel. The song was written by the members of Dúo Dinámico.

Before Eurovision

Internal selection controversy 
Originally, the artist chosen to perform "La, la, la" at Eurovision was singer-songwriter Joan Manuel Serrat. However, he intended to sing the song in Catalan. The Francoist State would not allow this – and insisted that the entry should be performed in Spanish, official language for all the territories of Spain, although Serrat wanted to claim for the other regional languages of this country, in accordance with the language politics in Spain at that time.

On 29 March 1968, one week before the contest, Massiel was asked to replace Joan Manuel Serrat as Spain's representative at the Eurovision Song Contest.

At Eurovision 
Massiel performed 15th in the night of the contest, following Ireland and preceding Germany. At the close of voting Massiel had received 29 points, winning the contest for Spain.

Voting 
Every country had a jury of ten people. Every jury member could give one point to his or her favourite song.

Vote rigging allegations 
In May 2008, a documentary by Spanish film-maker Montse Fernández Villa, 1968. Yo viví el mayo español, centred on the effects of May 1968 in Francoist Spain, and alleged that the 1968 Eurovision Song Contest was rigged by the Spanish caudillo Francisco Franco, who would have sent state television officials across Europe offering cash and promising to buy television series and contract unknown artists. The allegation was based on a testimony by journalist José María Íñigo, a TVE employee at the time, who claimed the rigging was common knowledge and suggested that Spanish record label representatives offered to release albums by Bulgarian and Czech artists (neither Bulgaria nor Czechoslovakia were members of the European Broadcasting Union at the time).

The documentary claimed that the contest should in fact have been won by the United Kingdom's entry – "Congratulations" performed by Cliff Richard – which finished second by one vote. Massiel, the performer of the winning entry, was outraged by the allegations, and claimed that if there had been fixes, "other singers, who were more keen on Franco's regime, would have benefited". José María Iñigo, author of the statement in the documentary, personally apologized to Massiel and claimed that he had repeated a widespread rumour and that his words had been taken out of context. Both Massiel and Iñigo accused television channel La Sexta, broadcaster of the documentary, of manufacturing the scandal.

References 

1968
Countries in the Eurovision Song Contest 1968
Eurovision